Félix Anglada Zariquey (born 11 February 1949, in Barcelona) is a sailor from Spain, who represented his country at the 1976 Summer Olympics in Kingston, Ontario, Canada as crew member in the Soling. With helmsman Juan Costas and fellow crew member Humberto Costas they took the 12th place.

Sources
 

Living people
1949 births
Sailors at the 1976 Summer Olympics – Soling
Olympic sailors of Spain
Sportspeople from Barcelona
Spanish male sailors (sport)